The Trakiya Heights (‘Trakiyski Vazvisheniya’ \tra-'kiy-ski v&z-vi-'she-ni-ya\) are the heights rising to  (Irakli Peak) on Trinity Peninsula, Antarctic Peninsula. The  heights are bounded by Russell West Glacier to the north, Srem Gap and Russell East Glacier to the northeast, Victory Glacier to the southwest and Zlidol Gate to the northwest. The heights surmount Prince Gustav Channel, Weddell Sea to the southeast.

The heights are named after the historical region of Trakiya (Thrace).

Location
German-British mapping in 1996.

Maps
 Trinity Peninsula. Scale 1:250000 topographic map No. 5697. Institut für Angewandte Geodäsie and British Antarctic Survey, 1996.
 Antarctic Digital Database (ADD). Scale 1:250000 topographic map of Antarctica. Scientific Committee on Antarctic Research (SCAR), 1993–2016.

References
 Bulgarian Antarctic Gazetteer. Antarctic Place-names Commission. (details in Bulgarian, basic data in English)
 Trakiya Heights. SCAR Composite Antarctic Gazetteer.

External links
Trakiya Heights. Copernix satellite image

Mountains of Trinity Peninsula
Bulgaria and the Antarctic